Joseph d'Honon de Gallifet (died 1706) was a French aristocrat and colonial administrator. He served as the Governor of Saint-Domingue (now Haiti) from 1700 to 1703, and the Governor of Guadeloupe from 1703 to 1706. Gallifet dealt with the reality of buccaneers as soon as he arrived in Saint-Domingue.

References

1706 deaths
People from Provence
French colonial governors of Guadeloupe
Governors of Saint-Domingue